The 40th National Assembly of Quebec consisted of those elected in the 2012 general election and two by-elections in December 2013. Pauline Marois (PQ) was the premier. The leader of the opposition changed twice. Jean-Marc Fournier (Liberal) started as leader of the opposition after the resignation of former Liberal Premier Jean Charest who lost his seat in the last provincial election. Philippe Couillard was elected Liberal leader and won election to the assembly in a by-election on December 9, 2013. The assembly was dissolved on March 5, 2014.

Member list

Cabinet ministers are in bold, party leaders are in italic and the president of the National Assembly is marked with a †.

Standings changes during the legislature

References

40